Milton Óscar Casco (born 11 April 1988) is an Argentine professional footballer who plays as left-back for River Plate.

Club career
Born in María Grande, Entre Ríos Province, Casco began his professional career with Gimnasia y Esgrima La Plata of the Argentine Primera División in 2009. In July 2012 he signed for Newell's Old Boys under manager Gerardo Martino, who bought 50% of his economic rights.

In August 2015, Casco was close to a €2.5 million move to French club Olympique de Marseille. The transfer fell through when compatriot Marcelo Bielsa unexpectedly resigned as the Ligue 1 team's manager.

On 9 September 2015, Casco signed a three-year contract with CA River Plate, with the Buenos Aires-based club purchasing 85% of his economic rights for $3 million. He made his debut four days later in the Superclásico against arch-rivals Boca Juniors, a 1–0 home loss.

International career
On 27 May, uncapped Casco was selected by coach Gerardo Martino for the 2015 Copa América in Chile. He made his debut in a preparation friendly on  7 June at the Estadio San Juan del Bicentenario, filling in for Facundo Roncaglia for the final 29 minutes of a 5–0 win over Bolivia; however, he did not feature in the tournament, in which his country lost to the hosts in the final.

Absent from the national team since the 2015 tournament, Casco was a surprise inclusion for the 2019 Copa América in Brazil, with Lionel Scaloni picking him ahead of Gabriel Mercado. He played one game of a third-place finish, the 1–1 group draw with Paraguay at the Mineirão.

Honours
Newell's Old Boys
 Argentine Primera División: 2013 Final

River Plate
 Recopa Sudamericana: 2016, 2019
 Copa Argentina: 2015–16, 2016–17
 Supercopa Argentina: 2017
 Copa Libertadores: 2018

Argentina
 Copa América: runner-up 2015, third place 2019

References

External links

1988 births
Living people
People from Paraná Department
Argentine footballers
Association football midfielders
Club de Gimnasia y Esgrima La Plata footballers
Newell's Old Boys footballers
Club Atlético River Plate footballers
2015 Copa América players
2019 Copa América players
Argentina international footballers
Argentine Primera División players
Primera Nacional players
Sportspeople from Entre Ríos Province